Ping Lian Yeak (born 1993) is a Malaysian Australian artist based in Sydney. He is described as having reached a significant artistic achievement. He was diagnosed with autism at a young age.

Overview 
Born in Kuala Lumpur, Malaysia in 1993, Pian Lian Yeak was diagnosed with autism at a young age and was gradually trained in visual arts through the use of private instruction. After his family moved to Sydney in 2006, Yeak's work gained notice and began to be featured at various art and educational venues, including the Treffert center in the United States, and at the United Nations building in New York. Yeak's work is described as "colourful and attractive", and he has been described as an austistic savant.

His art was introduced to the United States at an exhibition at Cooper Union University in Manhattan and the Henry Gregg Gallery in Brooklyn by Dr. Rosa Martinez and Dr. Becke in January 2006. Coverage of Yeak's artistic contribution as an individual with autism also include a feature in a documentary aired on the Australian ABC.

Yeak was a finalist in the Australian Government's 2008 National Disability Awards.

See also 
 Autistic art
 Autism rights movement

References 

1993 births
Malaysian Australian
Malaysian artists
Artists with autism
Living people